is a Japanese professional footballer who plays as a forward for Renofa Yamaguchi.

References

External links

2003 births
Living people
Japanese footballers
Association football forwards
Renofa Yamaguchi FC players
J2 League players